Josef Moser (24 January 1917 – 18 August 1944) was an Austrian cyclist. He competed in the team pursuit event at the 1936 Summer Olympics.

References

External links
 

1917 births
1944 deaths
Austrian male cyclists
Olympic cyclists of Austria
Cyclists at the 1936 Summer Olympics